James Monroe High School (JMHS), at 9229 Haskell Avenue in North Hills, California, is a public high school in the Los Angeles Unified School District. It is home to Small Learning Communities (SLCs) and two magnet schools. Its mascot is the Viking.

History
The school opened in the fall of 1958.

The team name Vikings was selected by a student leadership class, as were the school colors and song. The Multipurpose room was named Odin's Hall, and the Annual was named "Valhalla".

It was in the Los Angeles City High School District until 1961, when it merged into LAUSD.

In 2004, five drop-out students including future rapper Hopsin were arrested for vandalizing James Monroe High School property, which was intended to be a school prank. They were later all charged and held on $20,000 bail.

The opening of Panorama High School in October 2006 relieved overcrowding at JMHS.

In 2010, it was ranked 420 in Newsweek's list of U.S. high schools.

Smaller Learning Communities (SLCs) 
 
9th Grade Academy
ARMY JROTC program called the Viking Battalion
Arts, Media, & Entertainment
Public Service (Fire Academy)
Engineering & Design (including the Monroe SAS)
Magnet (Law & Government and Police Academy)

School for Advanced Studies (SAS)
The Monroe School for Advanced Studies, formed in 2001, belongs to the larger SLC of Engineering & Design.

Magnet schools 
The school offers two Magnet programs to prepare students to pursue careers in law, police science, criminology, forensics, and related fields.

Monroe Law and Government Magnet 
Established in 1991
Activities like mock trials, debate team, internships, Junior Statesmen of America membership, and invitations to events by local politicians
Graduates accepted at top universities including Harvard, Stanford, Yale, USC, UC Berkeley, UCLA

Monroe Police Academy Magnet 
Established in 1996
Special physical education class with obstacle course
 Student immersion in career opportunities in a range of law enforcement related fields

Mock trial competitions 
Because of the Law and Government Magnet, Monroe has its own courtroom. It has a mock trial team that competes in the Los Angeles County Mock Trial Competition run by the Constitutional Rights Foundation, where about 80 schools compete each year. From 2002 to 2007, Monroe reached the semifinals four times, and the quarterfinals two times. In 2008, it reached the finals but lost to Gabrielino High.
In 2009, Monroe once again took 2nd place, losing by .76% to Louisville High School, a private all-girls school.

Notable alumni 

Angelyne – model and Los Angeles icon
Meredith Baxter – actress, producer (briefly attended during her sophomore year)
Guy Benjamin – NFL quarterback for the Dolphins, Saints, and 49ers
Brandon Browner – NFL player for the Seahawks, Patriots and Saints
Larry Cedar – TV character actor
Doug DeCinces – former Major League Baseball player for the Baltimore Orioles and California Angels
John Ennis – former Major League Baseball player
Jon V. Ferrara – computer software entrepreneur, CEO Nimble Inc., co-founder of GoldMine CRM, one of the early pioneers in Contact Management, Sales Force Automation (SFA) & Customer Relationship Management (CRM) software
Hopsin – rapper 
Jimmy Keegan – drummer for Spock's Beard, Santana and Kenny Loggins
Lori Lively – actress and older sister of Blake Lively and Jason Lively
Wayne Massey – actor, recording artist, musician, music producer, CEO; varsity baseball pitcher for Monroe and drafted by Los Angeles Angels
Kevin Mitnick – computer security consultant and convicted hacker
William T. Perkins, Jr. – Medal of Honor recipient, Vietnam War, 1967
Gary M. Rose – Medal of Honor recipient, Vietnam War, 1970
Sharon Shapiro - gymnast
Steve Wapnick – former Major League Baseball player
Ron Wasserman – award-winning television composer, songwriter and producer
Debra Winger – Academy Award-nominated actress

References

External links 

Educational institutions established in 1958
Los Angeles Unified School District schools
Magnet schools in California
High schools in the San Fernando Valley
High schools in Los Angeles
Public high schools in California
1958 establishments in California